33 Service Battalion is a Canadian Forces Primary Reserve unit with three companies located in northern and eastern Ontario - at the M.L. Troy Armoury in North Bay, Pine Street Armoury in Sault Ste Marie, and the Major Holland Armoury in Ottawa. The battalion is under command of 33 Canadian Brigade Group, itself commanded by the 4th Canadian Division.  The battalion is made up of officers and soldiers primarily from the Royal Canadian Logistics Service and the Royal Canadian Electrical and Mechanical Engineers providing Combat Service Support to 33 Canadian Brigade Group and other military organizations in eastern and northern Ontario - by means of transportation, supply, administration, food services, and mechanical repair and recovery activities.

History 
The first reserve service support unit was organized in Ottawa on 1 July 1903 when a 1st Class Stores Section of the Ordnance Corps was established in the Military Stores Building behind Cartier Square Drill Hall.  The unit was composed of members of the Permanent Force and transfers from both the Governor General's Foot Guards (GGFG) and the 43rd Regiment, Duke of Cornwall’s Own Rifles (perpetuated by The Cameron Highlanders of Ottawa (Duke of Edinburgh’s Own).  The battalion's lineage from this point forward is complicated, with many changes in organizational structure and nomenclature occurring from pre-WWI and the eventual move from a horse-based military to the modern mechanized force of today.  The complexity of military equipment and ever changing tactics and operations led to changes to the ideology of Combat Service Support including the formation of new corps such as the Royal Canadian Electrical Mechanical Engineers (RCEME) to maintain the complex equipment, Royal Canadian Army Service Corps (providing Transportation Services) and the Royal Canadian Ordnance Corps (managing the control of all material required by the Canadian Army). The latter two Corps eventually combined under the Royal Canadian Logistics Service title.

During the First World War, units of No. 4 Militia District (Ottawa) supplied men to the Canadian Expeditionary Force.  In 1914, No. 5 Company (Ottawa) of the Canadian Army Service Corps moved to Valcartier where it provided transport and support for the CEF preparing for overseas service.  It supplied men for the 1st Divisional Trains when they moved to England and France.

During the Second World War, 1st Corps Troops, RCASC mobilized at Landsdowne Park and formed No.1 Petrol Park and No. 1 Ordnance Company.  On arrival in England they were reorganized into 54 and 55 General Transport Companies, RCASC, and served in the Italian and European campaigns.

On the outbreak of the Korean War, 1st Corps Troops provided personnel and command staff to form 54 General Transport Company, RCASC which served the 25th Canadian Infantry Brigade of the Commonwealth Division.  In recognition of its contribution to the Division, the unit was presented the Commonwealth Shield trophy which was then competed for annually and awarded to the best reserve Transportation Coy in Canada up to and including 1982.

In 1965 the Ottawa Service Battalion was created to test a new service support concept - amalgamating  several corps into one organization - which was then adopted nationally in 1968.  The Ottawa Service Battalion was first composed of personnel from 130 Transport Coy, 3 Ordnance Coy, 28 Technical Sqn, 13 Personnel Depot, 113 Manning Depot, 10 Medical Coy and 54 Dental Unit.  These units were disbanded to form the Battalion which had a single transport unit and a training wing.  This was later expanded into a transport coy, supply coy, maintenance coy, headquarters, MIR and MP detachment.

In 1975 all service Battalions were numbered geographically, Sault Ste Marie and North Bay becoming 26 Service Battalion and Ottawa became 28 Service Battalion.  In 2009 the two units were amalgamated and in 2010 were renumbered as 33 Service Battalion in the re-organization of the Service Battalions nationally.

The Battalion has won many awards and trophies through the years, including the Commonwealth Shield three times.  Battalion members have served on domestic and international missions including Op RECUPERATION (January 1998 North American ice storm), Op LENTUS 17-03 (flood relief support in the Outaouais region of Quebec) and 19-03 (flood relief in the Ottawa valley area in Ontario), Op LASER 20-1 (Canadian Armed Forces response to the global COVID-19 pandemic) and combat missions in Bosnia, Croatia, and Afghanistan.  Additionally the Battalion has a long history of participation on United Nations mission including UNEF II, UNDOF, UNFICYP, UNIFIL, UNTAG, and UNMISS.

28 Service Battalion received the Freedom of the City of Ottawa in 1981.  In 1987 on successive weekends (27 September and 3 October) 26 Service Battalion was awarded the Freedom of the City in Sault Ste Marie and North Bay respectively. Following amalgamation, in 2010 33 Service Battalion exercised its right to march the streets of Ottawa for the first time as a formed body from all three geographic locations.

Leadership 
Commanding officers:

 2010–2012: Lieutenant Colonel Bruce Playfair, CD
 2012–2015: Lieutenant Colonel Sheila K. Chapman, CD
 2015–2019: Lieutenant Colonel David A. Paterson, CD
 2020–Present: Lieutenant Colonel Richard D. Gallant, CD

Regimental Sergeants Major:

 2010–2013: Chief Warrant Officer Robert Winfield, CD
 2013–2017: Chief Warrant Officer Denis Lessard, CD
 2017–2020: Chief Warrant Officer Marc Richard, CD
 2020–Present: Chief Warrant Officer Kriston D. Carter, CD

Honours and awards
 Commonwealth Shield won 3 times, the latest in 1982
 Freedom of the City of Ottawa: 1981 (as 28 Service Battalion) 
 Freedom of the City of North Bay:  3 October 1987 (as 26 Service Battalion)
 Freedom of the City of Sault Ste Marie: 27 September 1987 (as 26 Service Battalion)
33 CBG Iron Warrior Champions 2016, 2017, 2018, 2019

Cadet corps 
Active:
 2310 Royal Canadian Army Cadet Corps – Sault Ste Marie
 2332 Royal Canadian Army Cadet Corps – Ottawa

References

External links
 The Ottawa Service Battalion Association, a voluntary association of current and past unit members
 33 Service Battalion on the Canadian Armed Forces website
 33 SERVICE BATTALION, Unit badge, per the Public Register of Arms, Flags and Badges

Battalions of the Canadian Army
Organizations based in Ottawa